Elections to the Rajasthan Legislative Assembly were held on 29 February 1952. 616 candidates contested for the 140 constituencies in the Assembly. There were 20 two-member constituencies and 120 single-member constituencies.

Results

!colspan=10|
|- style="background-color:#E9E9E9; text-align:center;"
! colspan=2|Party !! Flag !! Seats  Contested !! Won !! % of  Seats !! Votes !! Vote %
|- style="background: #90EE90;"
| 
| 
| 156 || 82 || 51.25 || 12,86,953 || 39.46
|-
| 
|
| 59 || 24 || 15.00 || 3,99,958 || 12.26
|-
| 
|
| 51 || 1 || 0.63 || 1,35,971 || 4.17
|-
| 
|
| 50 || 8 || 5.00 || 1,93,532 || 5.93
|-
| 
|
| 46 || 7 || 43.75 || 2,70,807 || 8.30
|-
| 
|
| 6 || 2 || 1.25 || 28,183 || 0.86
|-
| 
|
| 6 || 1 || 0.63 || 16,411 || 0.50
|-
| 
|
| 230 || 35 || 21.88 || 8,96,671 || 27.49
|- class="unsortable" style="background-color:#E9E9E9"
! colspan = 3| Total seats
! 160 !! style="text-align:center;" |Voters !! 92,68,215 !! style="text-align:center;" |Turnout !! 32,61,442 (35.19%)
|}

* : On 1 November 1956, under States Reorganisation Act, 1956, the Ajmer State, the Abu Road taluk of the Banaskantha district of Bombay State, the Sunel enclave of the Mandsaur district and the Lohara sub-tehsil of the Hissar district of the Punjab was merged with Rajasthan while the Sironj sub-division of the Kota district of Rajasthan was transferred to Madhya Pradesh.

Elected members

State Reorganization
On 1 November 1956, under States Reorganisation Act, 1956, the Ajmer State, the Abu Road taluk of the Banaskantha district of Bombay State, the Sunel enclave of the Mandsaur district and the Lohara sub-tehsil of the Hissar district of the Punjab was merged with Rajasthan while the Sironj sub-division of the Kota district of Rajasthan was transferred to Madhya Pradesh. This resulted in the change in assembly constituencies from 140 with 160 seats to 136 with 176 seats in 1957 assembly elections.

See also

 1951–52 elections in India
 1957 Rajasthan Legislative Assembly election

References

Rajasthan
1952
1952
March 1952 events in Asia